Rechelle Margaret Hawkes,  (born 30 May 1967 in Albany, Western Australia) is the former captain of the Australian Women's Hockey Team, best known as the Hockeyroos,she was captain for eight years and became the second Australian woman after swimmer Dawn Fraser to win three Olympic gold medals at three separate Olympic Games: Seoul 1988, Atlanta 1996 and Sydney 2000.

Hawkes also competed at the 1992 Summer Olympics in Barcelona, where Australia finished fifth. She made her debut in 1985, and reached a milestone in 1999, when the midfield player celebrated 250 games for the national team. She read the Athlete's Olympic Oath at the Sydney 2000 Olympic Games.

She received a Medal of the Order of Australia in 1989, an Australian Sports Medal in 2000, and a Centenary Medal in 2001. In 2001, she was inducted into the Australian Institute of Sport 'Best of the Best'.<ref>Australian Institute of Sport 'Best of the Best'  </</ref> She was inducted into the Sport Australia Hall of Fame in 2002.

Hawkes is currently Assistant Coach to the Victoria Park Xavier Hockey Club's women's first side (for season 2010).

In the 2018 Australia Day Honours, Hawkes was made a Member of the Order of Australia "For significant service to hockey, particularly as national captain of multiple tournament-winning teams, and as a role model and commentator."

References

External links
 
IOC 2000 Summer Olympics
Profile at WomenAustralia.info

1967 births
Australian female field hockey players
Olympic field hockey players of Australia
Olympic gold medalists for Australia
Commonwealth Games gold medallists for Australia
Field hockey players at the 1988 Summer Olympics
Field hockey players at the 1992 Summer Olympics
Field hockey players at the 1996 Summer Olympics
Field hockey players at the 2000 Summer Olympics
People from Albany, Western Australia
Field hockey people from Western Australia
Western Australian Sports Star of the Year winners
Living people
Olympic medalists in field hockey
Recipients of the Medal of the Order of Australia
Recipients of the Australian Sports Medal
Recipients of the Centenary Medal
Sport Australia Hall of Fame inductees
Australian Institute of Sport field hockey players
Medalists at the 2000 Summer Olympics
Medalists at the 1996 Summer Olympics
Medalists at the 1988 Summer Olympics
Commonwealth Games medallists in field hockey
Members of the Order of Australia
Oath takers at the Olympic Games
Field hockey players at the 1998 Commonwealth Games
20th-century Australian women
Sportswomen from Western Australia
Medallists at the 1998 Commonwealth Games